The Foreign Office papal visit memo was an incident that occurred in the United Kingdom in April 2010, after it was revealed that two Foreign Office civil servants working on preparing the State Visit of Pope Benedict XVI in 2010 had sent out an internal memo containing remarks that could be considered insults to the Pope. The incident received wide media coverage and speculation that the Pope might cancel the state visit. The Vatican subsequently confirmed that it would be going ahead with the planned visit.

The memo suggested that Pope Benedict XVI, during his visit, could launch a range of branded condoms, visit an abortion clinic, bless a gay marriage and apologise for the Spanish Armada. The cover note to the memo read "Please protect; these should not be shared externally. The 'ideal visit' paper in particular was the product of a brainstorm which took into account even the most far-fetched of ideas."

The civil servants alleged to be responsible for sending the memo were identified as Steven Mulvain, 23, the memo's main author, and Anjoum Noorani, 31, who authorised its circulation. It is thought that others were part of the team who drew up this memo. According to The Times, Steven Mulvain once described his hobby as "drinking a lot".

The Foreign Secretary, David Miliband, stated that he was "appalled" by the memo, and the British government apologised to the Pope and the Catholic Church, stating that the memo writer had been told orally and in writing that this was a serious error of judgment, adding that "this is clearly a foolish document that does not in any way reflect UK government or Foreign Office policy or views. Many of the ideas in the document are clearly ill-judged, naïve and disrespectful" and that "the Foreign Office very much regrets this incident and is deeply sorry for the offence which it has caused". Scottish Secretary Jim Murphy added: "These memos are vile, they're insulting, they're an embarrassment and, on behalf of, I think, the whole of the United Kingdom, I want to apologise to His Holiness the Pope." The British ambassador to the Vatican, Francis Campbell, met senior officials of the Holy See to express regret on behalf of the government.

The Foreign Office employees responsible for the memo were disciplined; Anjoum Noorani was suspended and was later given a final warning, exceptionally valid for five years instead of the usual one year, because of the severity of his actions. He was also banned from overseas postings for a duration of five years.

References

2010 in the United Kingdom
Foreign, Commonwealth and Development Office
Religious scandals
Anti-Catholicism in the United Kingdom
Holy See–United Kingdom relations